Lawrence Raghavendra is an Indian dance choreographer, actor, director, composer, dancer and playback singer. After making his debut as a dance choreographer in 1993, he began looking for acting opportunities. He began his career as an actor in 1998, in a Telugu film. He adopted the name "Raghava" in 2001, and worked for many prominent actors and directors in Tamil cinema throughout his career. He got his breakthrough with Telugu film Style and then Muni. Lawrence is also known for his intricate hip-hop and westernised dance moves and has won four Filmfare Awards and three Nandi Awards for best choreography. In 2015, after the death of former Indian president A. P. J. Abdul Kalam, Lawrence set up a charity trust in his name and donated .

Early life and background
Lawrence had a brain tumor when he was a child. He attributes the curing of his tumor to the deity, Raghavendra Swamy, and in an act of devotion, he took the name Raghava. He built the Raghavendra Swamy Brindavanam Temple at Thirumullaivayal on the Avadi-Ambattur route, which opened on 1 January 2010.

Career

Initial career (1989–2001) 
He was working as a car cleaner for fight master Super Subbarayan. Rajinikanth saw him dancing and helped him to join the Dancers Union.
Lawrence first appeared in a song in Samsara Sangeetham a Tamil film in 1989 directed by T. Rajendran. Then he appeared in Donga Police in 1991, also doing some dances with Prabhu Deva. He was a background dancer in the song Chikku Bukku Chikku Bukku Railey in Gentleman (1993). He also appeared in dance sequences in Muta Mesthri (1993), Rakshana (1993) and Allari Priyudu (1993). Chiranjeevi offered him the job of choreographing the dances for Hitler (1997). Pleased with Lawrence's work, Chiranjeevi asked him to choreograph dances for Master (1997), his next film too. Producer T V D Prasad offered him the role of a hero in his venture Speed Dancer (1999). That film was a flop. After that he acted small roles in Tamil like Ajith Kumar's Unnai Kodu Ennai Tharuven (2000) and Prashanth's Parthen Rasithen (2000). Director K. Balachander invited him to act in his 100th film Parthale Paravasam (2001).

Establishing career (2002–2010) 
He acted as a first lead role in the Tamil movie Arpudham (2002). As described by review sify , the latest in the line is Lawrence, who like his predecessor Prabhu Deva, is determined to be a hero. Arputham has a decent screenplay and Lawrence is tolerable. Thereafter, Style (2002). He also made a guest appearance with Vijay in the Tamil movie Thirumalai (2003). After a guest appearance in the film Thendral (2004), he directed his first film in Telugu, Mass (2004) starring Nagarjuna and Jyothika. The movie was a commercial success.

He got his breakthrough with the Muni (2007), a horror thriller film. Thereafter, he directed another film, Don (2007). The film starring Nagarjuna  and Anushka Shetty. Raghava acted in second roles and made the film depending only on style and technical aspects. The movie had an average response. 
Raghava continues to play in different categories films such as Pandi (2008), Rajadhi Raja (2009) and Irumbukkottai Murattu Singam (2010). Pandi was a moderate success, while Rajadhi Raja 
and Irumbukkottai Murattu Singam were released to mixed reviews.

Later career (2011–present) 
He takes the series Muni in Kanchana (2011). Sarath Kumar play in the main role. The movie was commercially successful. In 2012, he directed Telugu movie Rebel starring Prabhas and Tamannaah. He acted in Kanchana 2 (2015). In 2017, he starred in an action Masala film, Motta Shiva Ketta Shiva. Sify described the film as, "Crass, loud and brainless." Then another of genre horror Shivalinga, remake a Kannada language with the same name directed by P. Vasu. Shakthi Vasudevan, son of director, also starred in the important role for two versions. The story is a cop investigating the suspicious death of a Muslim finds out that his own wife has become possessed by the young man's ghost. Raghava Lawrence is back with the fourth movie in the series – Muni 4: Kanchana 3: Kaali (2019), with the new change being three heroines. The film has received a good collections at the box office. In 2020, he made his directorial debut in Bollywood with film, Laxmii, a remake of Muni 2: Kanchana.

Social work
He did many social service activities in which he has aided many heart surgeries for small children. He was one of the supporters of the bull-riding sport jallikattu after its ban in 2017. During a protest in Tamil Nadu in January 2017, he provided food, medicine and basic needs to the protesters and promised to support them until the protests were over. He asked for an appointment with Kerala chief minister Pinarayi Vijayan to donate 1 crore as relief fund for the Kerala flood victims.

Filmography

Director

Actor
 All films are in Tamil language, unless otherwise noted

Dancer

Television
 Masthaana Masthaana Part II (2007)

Discography

As a playback singer

As a music composer

As lyricist

Accolades

References

External links
 
 Lawrence Charitable Trust

Living people
Telugu film directors
Indian film choreographers
Tamil film directors
Filmfare Awards South winners
Male actors in Telugu cinema
Male actors in Tamil cinema
20th-century Indian male actors
21st-century Indian male actors
Tamil film score composers
Telugu film score composers
Nandi Award winners
Male actors from Andhra Pradesh
Film directors from Andhra Pradesh
People from Guntur
Film producers from Andhra Pradesh
Musicians from Andhra Pradesh
Place of birth missing (living people)
1976 births